Zdeněk Nekula (born 9 February 1970) is a Czech politician and manager, who has served as the Czech Minister of Agriculture in Petr Fiala's Cabinet since January 2022.

References

1970 births
Living people
People from Znojmo
Agriculture ministers of the Czech Republic
Mendel University Brno alumni
KDU-ČSL Government ministers
Mayors of places in the Czech Republic
KDU-ČSL mayors